The Hungarian Democratic People's Party (MDNP) was a political party in Hungary between 1996 and 2005.

History
The national conservative party formed on 4 March 1996, when Iván Szabó and his supporters left Hungarian Democratic Forum (MDF) following Szabó's defeat against Sándor Lezsák at the party leadership election. 15 MPs, including several prominent politicians, such as György Szabad, Géza Jeszenszky and Imre Kónya, formed a parliamentary group and Szabó became its leader.

The MDNP did not hit the 5% threshold contrary at the 1998 parliamentary election, as a result Szabó resigned from his position. He was replaced by Erzsébet Pusztai. Under her leadership, the party joined the moderate centre alliance of Christian Democratic People's Party (KDNP), Alliance of Green Democrats (ZDSZ) and Third Way for Hungary (HOM), which formed Centre Party. Mihály Kupa's alliance won 3.9% of the popular vote and no seats at the 2002 parliamentary election.

József Szabó was elected the new president of the MDNP in June 2002. MDNP supported MDF at 2004 European Parliament election. The unusual alliance of centre-right and centre-left groups hindered the Centre Party's effectiveness and, eventually, two of the founding political formations, KDNP and MDNP quit the party on 31 December 2004. the Hungarian Democratic People's Party re-merged with the Hungarian Democratic Forum on 2 April 2005.

Presidents of the MDNP
 Iván Szabó (1996–1998)
 Erzsébet Pusztai (1998–2002)
 József Szabó (2002–2005)

Parliamentary representation
The 15-member parliamentary group of Hungarian Democratic People's Party formed on 11 March 1996:

Leader
Iván Szabó, Minister of Finance (1993–1994)

Deputy Leaders
Erzsébet Pusztai, later President of the MDNP (1998–2002)
György Raskó agrarian entrepreneur
György Szabad, Speaker of the National Assembly (1990–1994)

Members
 Etelka Barsi-Pataky, Member of the European Parliament (2004–2009)
 László Bogár economist, publicist
 Gabriella Farkas jurist
 Géza Jeszenszky, Minister of Foreign Affairs (1990–1994)
 Tamás Katona, Mayor of Budavár (1994–1998)
 Imre Kónya, Ministry of Interior (1993–1994)
 Katalin Kónya-Kutrucz jurist, wife of Imre Kónya
 Ferenc Kulin, Leader of the MDF parliamentary group (1993–1994)
 Tamás Szabó, Minister for Privatisation (1992–1994)
 Tihamér Tóth jurist
 Attila Zsigmond, Director-General of Budapest Gallery

Electoral results

National Assembly

1 MDNP was a member of the alliance of Centre Party

References

Conservative parties in Hungary
Defunct political parties in Hungary
1996 establishments in Hungary
2005 disestablishments in Hungary